The 114th United States Congress was a meeting of the legislative branch of the United States of America federal government, composed of the United States Senate and the United States House of Representatives. It met in Washington, D.C., from January 3, 2015, to January 3, 2017, during the final two years of Barack Obama's presidency. The seats in the House were apportioned based on the 2010 United States census.

The 2014 elections gave the Republicans control of the Senate and the House for the first time since the 109th Congress. With 248 seats in the House of Representatives and 54 seats in the Senate, this Congress began with the largest Republican majority since the 71st Congress of 1929–1931.

Major events

 January 6, 2015: Incumbent Speaker of the House John Boehner was re-elected even though several members of his own party once again chose not to vote for him. He received 216 votes, a majority of the votes cast, but two votes shy of a majority of the full membership.
 January 20, 2015: 2015 State of the Union Address
 March 3, 2015: Prime Minister of Israel Benjamin Netanyahu addressed a joint session of Congress regarding sanctions against Iran. Netanyahu was invited by Speaker John Boehner without consulting President Obama.
 March 9, 2015: U.S. Senator Tom Cotton wrote and sent a letter to the leadership of the Islamic Republic of Iran, signed by 47 of the Senate's 54 Republicans, attempting to cast doubt on the Obama administration's authority to engage in nuclear-proliferation negotiations with Iran.
 March 25, 2015: Afghanistan President Ashraf Ghani addressed a joint session of Congress.
 April 29, 2015: Japanese Prime Minister Shinzō Abe addressed a joint session of Congress, becoming the first Japanese leader to do so.
 September 24, 2015: Pope Francis addressed a joint session of Congress, becoming the first Pope to do so.
 September 25, 2015: House Speaker John Boehner announced that he would resign as Speaker and from the House at the end of October 2015. Subsequently, Majority Leader Kevin McCarthy, the presumptive favorite to succeed John Boehner, unexpectedly withdrew his candidacy for the job.
 October 29, 2015: Paul Ryan was elected to succeed John Boehner as Speaker of the House receiving 236 votes (of 432 votes cast). He is the youngest Speaker since James G. Blaine in 1869.
 January 12, 2016: 2016 State of the Union Address
 June 8, 2016: Indian Prime Minister Narendra Modi addressed a joint session of Congress.
 June 22–23, 2016: In the wake of the Orlando nightclub shooting, Congress debated gun control reform. The U.S. House recessed for the July 4 holiday during a sit-in protest held by Democrats that halted business in the chamber for more than 24 hours.
 November 8, 2016: Donald Trump and Mike Pence elected as president and vice-president in presidential elections, while the Republicans retain majority at both Senate and House of Representatives.

Major legislation

Enacted

 January 12, 2015: Terrorism Risk Insurance Program Reauthorization Act of 2015, 
 February 27, 2015: Protecting Volunteer Firefighters and Emergency Responders Act, Pub.L. 114-3
 March 4, 2015: Department of Homeland Security Appropriations Act, 2015, Pub.L. 114-4
 April 16, 2015: Medicare Access and CHIP Reauthorization Act of 2015, 
 May 22, 2015: Iran Nuclear Agreement Review Act of 2015, 
 June 2, 2015: USA FREEDOM Act: Uniting and Strengthening America by Fulfilling Rights and Ensuring Effective Discipline Over Monitoring Act of 2015, 
 June 29, 2015: Trade Preferences Extension Act of 2015, 
 July 6, 2015: Department of Homeland Security Interoperable Communications Act, 
 September 25, 2015: Gerardo Hernandez Airport Security Act of 2015, Pub.L. 114-50
 September 30, 2015: National Winstorm Impact Reduction Act Reauthorization of 2015, Pub.L. 114-52
 November 2, 2015: Bipartisan Budget Act of 2015, 
 November 5, 2015: Librarian of Congress Succession Modernization Act of 2015, 
 November 25, 2015: SPACE Act of 2015, 
 November 25, 2015: National Defense Authorization Act for Fiscal Year 2016, Pub.L. 114-92
 December 4, 2015: Fixing America's Surface Transportation (FAST) Act, 
 December 10, 2015: Every Student Succeeds Act, 
 December 18, 2015: Consolidated Appropriations Act, 2016, 
 January 28, 2016: Grants Oversight and New Efficiency (GONE) Act, Pub.L. 114-117
 February 8, 2016: International Megan's Law to Prevent Sexual Exploitation and Other Crimes Through Advanced Notification of Traveling Sex Offenders, Pub.L. 114-119
 February 8, 2016: Coast Guard Authorization Act of 2015, 
 February 24, 2016: Internet Tax Freedom Act contained in Trade Facilitation and Trade Enforcement Act of 2015, 
 May 9, 2016: Protect and Preserve International Cultural Property Act, Pub.L. 114-151
 June 28, 2016: Frank R. Lautenberg Chemical Safety for the 21st Century Act, Pub. L. 114-182
 June 30, 2016: Puerto Rico Oversight, Management, and Economic Stability Act (PROMESA), Pub.L. 114-187
 July 20, 2016: Global Food Security Act of 2016, 
 July 29, 2016: Making Electronic Government Accountable By Yielding Tangible Efficiences (MEGABYTE) Act of 2016, Pub.L. 114-210
 September 28, 2016: Justice Against Sponsors of Terrorism Act, 
 September 29, 2016: Continuing Appropriations and Military Construction, Veterans Affairs, and Related Agencies Appropriations Act, 2017, and Zika Response and Preparedness Act, Pub.L. 114-223
 October 7, 2016: Sexual Assault Survivors' Rights Act, 
 December 10, 2016: Further Continuing and Security Assistance Appropriations Act, 2017, Pub.L. 114-254
 December 13, 2016: 21st Century Cures Act, 
 December 14, 2016: First Responder Anthrax Preparedness Act, Pub.L. 114-268
 December 14, 2016: Better Online Ticket Sales (BOTS) Act, Pub.L. 114-274
 December 16, 2016: Frank R. Wolf International Religious Freedom Act, Pub. L. 114-281
 December 16, 2016: United States-Israel Advanced Research Partnership Act of 2016, Pub.L. 114-304
 December 16, 2016: Holocaust Expropriated Art Recovery (HEAR) Act of 2016, Pub.L. 114-308
 December 16, 2016: Foreign Cultural Exchange Jurisdictional Immunity Clarification Act, Pub.L. 114-319
 December 23, 2016: National Defense Authorization Act for Fiscal Year 2017, Pub.L. 114-328
 January 6, 2017: American Innovation and Competitiveness Act, Pub.L. 114-329

Proposed

Vetoed
 February 24, 2015: Keystone XL Pipeline Approval Act
 March 31, 2015: A joint resolution providing for congressional disapproval under chapter 8 of title 5, United States Code, of the rule submitted by the National Labor Relations Board relating to representation case procedures.
 October 22, 2015: National Defense Authorization Act for Fiscal Year 2016
 December 19, 2015: A joint resolution providing for congressional disapproval under chapter 8 of title 5, United States Code, of a rule submitted by the Environmental Protection Agency relating to "Standards of Performance for Greenhouse Gas Emissions from New, Modified, and Reconstructed Stationary Sources: Electric Utility Generating Units"
 December 19, 2015: A joint resolution providing for congressional disapproval under chapter 8 of title 5, United States Code, of a rule submitted by the Environmental Protection Agency relating to "Carbon Pollution Emission Guidelines for Existing Stationary Sources: Electric Utility Generating Units"
 January 8, 2016: The Restoring Americans' Healthcare Freedom Reconciliation Act of 2015
 January 19, 2016: A joint resolution providing for congressional disapproval under chapter 8 of title 5, United States Code, of the rule submitted by the Corps of Engineers and the Environmental Protection Agency relating to the definition of "waters of the United States" under the Federal Water Pollution Control Act
 June 8, 2016: A joint resolution disapproving the rule submitted by the Department of Labor relating to the definition of the term "Fiduciary"
 July 22, 2016: Presidential Allowance Modernization Act of 2016
 September 23, 2016: Justice Against Sponsors of Terrorism Act (Passed over Veto)

Party summary
Resignations and new members are discussed in the "Changes in membership" section, below.

Senate

House of Representatives

Leadership

Senate

 President: Joe Biden (D)
 President pro tempore: Orrin Hatch (R)

Majority (Republican) leadership
 Majority Leader: Mitch McConnell
 Assistant Majority Leader (Majority Whip): John Cornyn
 Chief Deputy Whip: Mike Crapo
 Deputy Whips: 
 Republican Conference Chairman: John Thune
 Republican Conference Vice Chairman: Roy Blunt
 Senatorial Committee Chairman: Roger Wicker
 Policy Committee Chairman: John Barrasso

Minority (Democratic) leadership
 Minority Leader: Harry Reid
 Assistant Minority Leader (Minority Whip): Dick Durbin
 Chief Deputy Whip: Barbara Boxer
 Deputy Whips: 
 Democratic Caucus Chairman: Harry Reid
 Democratic Caucus Vice Chair and Policy Committee Chairman: Chuck Schumer
 Democratic Caucus Secretary: Patty Murray
 Senatorial Campaign Committee Chairman: Jon Tester
 Policy Committee Vice Chairwoman: Debbie Stabenow
 Policy Committee Strategic Policy Adviser: Elizabeth Warren
 Policy Committee Policy Development Adviser: Mark Warner
 Steering and Outreach Committee Chairwoman: Amy Klobuchar
 Steering and Outreach Committee Vice Chairwoman: Jeanne Shaheen

House of Representatives

 Speaker: John Boehner (R), until October 29, 2015
 Paul Ryan (R), from October 29, 2015

Majority (Republican) leadership
 Majority Leader: Kevin McCarthy
 Majority Whip: Steve Scalise
 Majority Chief Deputy Whip: Patrick McHenry
 Senior Deputy Whips: Kristi Noem, Dennis Ross, Aaron Schock (until March 31, 2015), Steve Stivers, Ann Wagner
 Republican Conference Chairwoman: Cathy McMorris Rodgers
 Republican Conference Vice-Chairwoman: Lynn Jenkins
 Republican Conference Secretary: Virginia Foxx
 Republican Campaign Committee Chairman: Greg Walden
 Policy Committee Chairman: Luke Messer
 Republican Campaign Committee Deputy Chairman: Lynn Westmoreland

Minority (Democratic) leadership
 Minority Leader: Nancy Pelosi
 Minority Whip: Steny Hoyer
 Assistant Democratic Leader: Jim Clyburn
 Senior Chief Deputy Minority Whip: John Lewis
 Chief Deputy Minority Whips: G. K. Butterfield, Diana DeGette, Keith Ellison, Jan Schakowsky, Kyrsten Sinema, Debbie Wasserman Schultz, Peter Welch
 Democratic Caucus Chairman: Xavier Becerra
 Democratic Caucus Vice-Chairman: Joe Crowley
 Democratic Campaign Committee Chairman: Ben Ray Luján
 Steering and Policy Committee Co-Chairs: Rosa DeLauro (Steering) and Donna Edwards (Policy)
 Organization, Study, and Review Chairwoman: Karen Bass
 Policy and Communications Chairman: Steve Israel

Members

Senate
Senators are listed by state and then by Senate classes, In this Congress, Class 3 meant their term ended with this Congress, requiring re-election in 2016; Class 1 meant their term began in the last Congress, requiring re-election in 2018; and Class 2 meant their term began in this Congress, requiring re-election in 2020.

Alabama
 2. Jeff Sessions (R)
 3. Richard Shelby (R)

Alaska
 2. Dan Sullivan (R)
 3. Lisa Murkowski (R)

Arizona
 1. Jeff Flake (R)
 3. John McCain (R)

Arkansas
 2. Tom Cotton (R)
 3. John Boozman (R)

California
 1. Dianne Feinstein (D)
 3. Barbara Boxer (D)

Colorado
 2. Cory Gardner (R)
 3. Michael Bennet (D)

Connecticut
 1. Chris Murphy (D)
 3. Richard Blumenthal (D)

Delaware
 1. Tom Carper (D)
 2. Chris Coons (D)

Florida
 1. Bill Nelson (D)
 3. Marco Rubio (R)

Georgia
 2. David Perdue (R)
 3. Johnny Isakson (R)

Hawaii
 1. Mazie Hirono (D)
 3. Brian Schatz (D)

Idaho
 2. Jim Risch (R)
 3. Mike Crapo (R)

Illinois
 2. Dick Durbin (D)
 3. Mark Kirk (R)

Indiana
 1. Joe Donnelly (D)
 3. Dan Coats (R)

Iowa
 2. Joni Ernst (R)
 3. Chuck Grassley (R)

Kansas
 2. Pat Roberts (R)
 3. Jerry Moran (R)

Kentucky
 2. Mitch McConnell (R)
 3. Rand Paul (R)

Louisiana
 2. Bill Cassidy (R)
 3. David Vitter (R)

Maine
 1. Angus King (I)
 2. Susan Collins (R)

Maryland
 1. Ben Cardin (D)
 3. Barbara Mikulski (D)

Massachusetts
 1. Elizabeth Warren (D)
 2. Ed Markey (D)

Michigan
 1. Debbie Stabenow (D)
 2. Gary Peters (D)

Minnesota
 1. Amy Klobuchar (DFL)
 2. Al Franken (DFL)

Mississippi
 1. Roger Wicker (R)
 2. Thad Cochran (R)

Missouri
 1. Claire McCaskill (D)
 3. Roy Blunt (R)

Montana
 1. Jon Tester (D)
 2. Steve Daines (R)

Nebraska
 1. Deb Fischer (R)
 2. Ben Sasse (R)

Nevada
 1. Dean Heller (R)
 3. Harry Reid (D)

New Hampshire
 2. Jeanne Shaheen (D)
 3. Kelly Ayotte (R)

New Jersey
 1. Bob Menendez (D)
 2. Cory Booker (D)

New Mexico
 1. Martin Heinrich (D)
 2. Tom Udall (D)

New York
 1. Kirsten Gillibrand (D)
 3. Chuck Schumer (D)

North Carolina
 2. Thom Tillis (R)
 3. Richard Burr (R)

North Dakota
 1. Heidi Heitkamp (D-NPL)
 3. John Hoeven (R)

Ohio
 1. Sherrod Brown (D)
 3. Rob Portman (R)

Oklahoma
 2. Jim Inhofe (R)
 3. James Lankford (R)

Oregon
 2. Jeff Merkley (D)
 3. Ron Wyden (D)

Pennsylvania
 1. Bob Casey Jr. (D)
 3. Pat Toomey (R)

Rhode Island
 1. Sheldon Whitehouse (D)
 2. Jack Reed (D)

South Carolina
 2. Lindsey Graham (R)
 3. Tim Scott (R)

South Dakota
 2. Mike Rounds (R)
 3. John Thune (R)

Tennessee
 1. Bob Corker (R)
 2. Lamar Alexander (R)

Texas
 1. Ted Cruz (R)
 2. John Cornyn (R)

Utah
 1. Orrin Hatch (R)
 3. Mike Lee (R)

Vermont
 1. Bernie Sanders (I)
 3. Patrick Leahy (D)

Virginia
 1. Tim Kaine (D)
 2. Mark Warner (D)

Washington
 1. Maria Cantwell (D)
 3. Patty Murray (D)

West Virginia
 1. Joe Manchin (D)
 2. Shelley Moore Capito (R)

Wisconsin
 1. Tammy Baldwin (D)
 3. Ron Johnson (R)

Wyoming
 1. John Barrasso (R)
 2. Mike Enzi (R)

House of Representatives

Alabama
 . Bradley Byrne (R)
 . Martha Roby (R)
 . Mike Rogers (R)
 . Robert Aderholt (R)
 . Mo Brooks (R)
 . Gary Palmer (R)
 . Terri Sewell (D)

Alaska
 . Don Young (R)

Arizona
 . Ann Kirkpatrick (D)
 . Martha McSally (R)
 . Raúl Grijalva (D)
 . Paul Gosar (R)
 . Matt Salmon (R)
 . David Schweikert (R)
 . Ruben Gallego (D)
 . Trent Franks (R)
 . Kyrsten Sinema (D)

Arkansas
 . Rick Crawford (R)
 . French Hill (R)
 . Steve Womack (R)
 . Bruce Westerman (R)

California
 . Doug LaMalfa (R)
 . Jared Huffman (D)
 . John Garamendi (D)
 . Tom McClintock (R)
 . Mike Thompson (D)
 . Doris Matsui (D)
 . Ami Bera (D)
 . Paul Cook (R)
 . Jerry McNerney (D)
 . Jeff Denham (R)
 . Mark DeSaulnier (D)
 . Nancy Pelosi (D)
 . Barbara Lee (D)
 . Jackie Speier (D)
 . Eric Swalwell (D)
 . Jim Costa (D)
 . Mike Honda (D)
 . Anna Eshoo (D)
 . Zoe Lofgren (D)
 . Sam Farr (D)
 . David Valadao (R)
 . Devin Nunes (R)
 . Kevin McCarthy (R)
 . Lois Capps (D)
 . Steve Knight (R)
 . Julia Brownley (D)
 . Judy Chu (D)
 . Adam Schiff (D)
 . Tony Cardenas (D)
 . Brad Sherman (D)
 . Pete Aguilar (D)
 . Grace Napolitano (D)
 . Ted Lieu (D)
 . Xavier Becerra (D)
 . Norma Torres (D)
 . Raul Ruiz (D)
 . Karen Bass (D)
 . Linda Sánchez (D)
 . Ed Royce (R)
 . Lucille Roybal-Allard (D)
 . Mark Takano (D)
 . Ken Calvert (R)
 . Maxine Waters (D)
 . Janice Hahn (D), until December 4, 2016
 Vacant
 . Mimi Walters (R)
 . Loretta Sanchez (D)
 . Alan Lowenthal (D)
 . Dana Rohrabacher (R)
 . Darrell Issa (R)
 . Duncan D. Hunter (R)
 . Juan Vargas (D)
 . Scott Peters (D)
 . Susan Davis (D)

Colorado
 . Diana DeGette (D)
 . Jared Polis (D)
 . Scott Tipton (R)
 . Ken Buck (R)
 . Doug Lamborn (R)
 . Mike Coffman (R)
 . Ed Perlmutter (D)

Connecticut
 . John Larson (D)
 . Joe Courtney (D)
 . Rosa DeLauro (D)
 . Jim Himes (D)
 . Elizabeth Esty (D)

Delaware
 . John Carney (D)

Florida
 . Jeff Miller (R)
 . Gwen Graham (D)
 . Ted Yoho (R)
 . Ander Crenshaw (R)
 . Corrine Brown (D)
 . Ron DeSantis (R)
 . John Mica (R)
 . Bill Posey (R)
 . Alan Grayson (D)
 . Daniel Webster (R)
 . Rich Nugent (R)
 . Gus Bilirakis (R)
 . David Jolly (R)
 . Kathy Castor (D)
 . Dennis Ross (R)
 . Vern Buchanan (R)
 . Tom Rooney (R)
 . Patrick Murphy (D)
 . Curt Clawson (R)
 . Alcee Hastings (D)
 . Ted Deutch (D)
 . Lois Frankel (D)
 . Debbie Wasserman Schultz (D)
 . Frederica Wilson (D)
 . Mario Díaz-Balart (R)
 . Carlos Curbelo (R)
 . Ileana Ros-Lehtinen (R)

Georgia
 . Buddy Carter (R)
 . Sanford Bishop (D)
 . Lynn Westmoreland (R)
 . Hank Johnson (D)
 . John Lewis (D)
 . Tom Price (R)
 . Rob Woodall (R)
 . Austin Scott (R)
 . Doug Collins (R)
 . Jody Hice (R)
 . Barry Loudermilk (R)
 . Rick Allen (R)
 . David Scott (D)
 . Tom Graves (R)

Hawaii
 . Mark Takai (D), until July 20, 2016
 Colleen Hanabusa (D), from November 8, 2016
 . Tulsi Gabbard (D)

Idaho
 . Raul Labrador (R)
 . Mike Simpson (R)

Illinois
 . Bobby Rush (D)
 . Robin Kelly (D)
 . Dan Lipinski (D)
 . Luis Gutiérrez (D)
 . Mike Quigley (D)
 . Peter Roskam (R)
 . Danny Davis (D)
 . Tammy Duckworth (D)
 . Jan Schakowsky (D)
 . Bob Dold (R)
 . Bill Foster (D)
 . Mike Bost (R)
 . Rodney Davis (R)
 . Randy Hultgren (R)
 . John Shimkus (R)
 . Adam Kinzinger (R)
 . Cheri Bustos (D)
 . Aaron Schock (R), until March 31, 2015
 Darin LaHood (R), from September 10, 2015

Indiana
 . Pete Visclosky (D)
 . Jackie Walorski (R)
 . Marlin Stutzman (R)
 . Todd Rokita (R)
 . Susan Brooks (R)
 . Luke Messer (R)
 . André Carson (D)
 . Larry Bucshon (R)
 . Todd Young (R)

Iowa
 . Rod Blum (R)
 . David Loebsack (D)
 . David Young (R)
 . Steve King (R)

Kansas
 . Tim Huelskamp (R)
 . Lynn Jenkins (R)
 . Kevin Yoder (R)
 . Mike Pompeo (R)

Kentucky
 . Ed Whitfield (R), until September 6, 2016
 James Comer (R), from November 8, 2016
 . Brett Guthrie (R)
 . John Yarmuth (D)
 . Thomas Massie (R)
 . Hal Rogers (R)
 . Andy Barr (R)

Louisiana
 . Steve Scalise (R)
 . Cedric Richmond (D)
 . Charles Boustany (R)
 . John Fleming (R)
 . Ralph Abraham (R)
 . Garret Graves (R)

Maine
 . Chellie Pingree (D)
 . Bruce Poliquin (R)

Maryland
 . Andy Harris (R)
 . Dutch Ruppersberger (D)
 . John Sarbanes (D)
 . Donna Edwards (D)
 . Steny Hoyer (D)
 . John Delaney (D)
 . Elijah Cummings (D)
 . Chris Van Hollen (D)

Massachusetts
 . Richard Neal (D)
 . Jim McGovern (D)
 . Niki Tsongas (D)
 . Joe Kennedy (D)
 . Katherine Clark (D)
 . Seth Moulton (D)
 . Mike Capuano (D)
 . Stephen Lynch (D)
 . Bill Keating (D)

Michigan
 . Dan Benishek (R)
 . Bill Huizenga (R)
 . Justin Amash (R)
 . John Moolenaar (R)
 . Dan Kildee (D)
 . Fred Upton (R)
 . Tim Walberg (R)
 . Mike Bishop (R)
 . Sander Levin (D)
 . Candice Miller (R), until December 31, 2016
 Vacant
 . Dave Trott (R)
 . Debbie Dingell (D)
 . John Conyers (D)
 . Brenda Lawrence (D)

Minnesota
 . Tim Walz (DFL)
 . John Kline (R)
 . Erik Paulsen (R)
 . Betty McCollum (DFL)
 . Keith Ellison (DFL)
 . Tom Emmer (R)
 . Collin Peterson (DFL)
 . Rick Nolan (DFL)

Mississippi
 . Alan Nunnelee (R), until February 6, 2015
 Trent Kelly (R), from June 2, 2015
 . Bennie Thompson (D)
 . Gregg Harper (R)
 . Steven Palazzo (R)

Missouri
 . Lacy Clay (D)
 . Ann Wagner (R)
 . Blaine Luetkemeyer (R)
 . Vicky Hartzler (R)
 . Emanuel Cleaver (D)
 . Sam Graves (R)
 . Billy Long (R)
 . Jason Smith (R)

Montana
 . Ryan Zinke (R)

Nebraska
 . Jeff Fortenberry (R)
 . Brad Ashford (D)
 . Adrian Smith (R)

Nevada
 . Dina Titus (D)
 . Mark Amodei (R)
 . Joe Heck (R)
 . Cresent Hardy (R)

New Hampshire
 . Frank Guinta (R)
 . Annie Kuster (D)

New Jersey
 . Donald Norcross (D)
 . Frank LoBiondo (R)
 . Tom MacArthur (R)
 . Chris Smith (R)
 . Scott Garrett (R)
 . Frank Pallone (D)
 . Leonard Lance (R)
 . Albio Sires (D)
 . Bill Pascrell (D)
 . Donald Payne Jr. (D)
 . Rodney Frelinghuysen (R)
 . Bonnie Watson Coleman (D)

New Mexico
 . Michelle Lujan Grisham (D)
 . Steve Pearce (R)
 . Ben Ray Luján (D)

New York
 . Lee Zeldin (R)
 . Peter King (R)
 . Steve Israel (D)
 . Kathleen Rice (D)
 . Gregory Meeks (D)
 . Grace Meng (D)
 . Nydia Velázquez (D)
 . Hakeem Jeffries (D)
 . Yvette Clarke (D)
 . Jerrold Nadler (D)
 . Dan Donovan (R), from May 5, 2015
 . Carolyn Maloney (D)
 . Charles Rangel (D)
 . Joseph Crowley (D)
 . José E. Serrano (D)
 . Eliot Engel (D)
 . Nita Lowey (D)
 . Sean Patrick Maloney (D)
 . Chris Gibson (R)
 . Paul Tonko (D)
 . Elise Stefanik (R)
 . Richard Hanna (R)
 . Thomas Reed (R)
 . John Katko (R)
 . Louise Slaughter (D)
 . Brian Higgins (D)
 . Chris Collins (R)

North Carolina
 . G. K. Butterfield (D)
 . Renee Ellmers (R)
 . Walter B. Jones Jr. (R)
 . David Price (D)
 . Virginia Foxx (R)
 . Mark Walker (R)
 . David Rouzer (R)
 . Richard Hudson (R)
 . Robert Pittenger (R)
 . Patrick McHenry (R)
 . Mark Meadows (R)
 . Alma Adams (D)
 . George Holding (R)

North Dakota
 . Kevin Cramer (R)

Ohio
 . Steve Chabot (R)
 . Brad Wenstrup (R)
 . Joyce Beatty (D)
 . Jim Jordan (R)
 . Bob Latta (R)
 . Bill Johnson (R)
 . Bob Gibbs (R)
 . John Boehner (R), until October 31, 2015
 Warren Davidson (R), from June 7, 2016
 . Marcy Kaptur (D)
 . Mike Turner (R)
 . Marcia Fudge (D)
 . Pat Tiberi (R)
 . Tim Ryan (D)
 . David Joyce (R)
 . Steve Stivers (R)
 . Jim Renacci (R)

Oklahoma
 . Jim Bridenstine (R)
 . Markwayne Mullin (R)
 . Frank Lucas (R)
 . Tom Cole (R)
 . Steve Russell (R)

Oregon
 . Suzanne Bonamici (D)
 . Greg Walden (R)
 . Earl Blumenauer (D)
 . Peter DeFazio (D)
 . Kurt Schrader (D)

Pennsylvania
 . Bob Brady (D)
 . Chaka Fattah (D), until June 23, 2016
 Dwight Evans (D), from November 8, 2016
 . Mike Kelly (R)
 . Scott Perry (R)
 . Glenn Thompson (R)
 . Ryan Costello (R)
 . Pat Meehan (R)
 . Mike Fitzpatrick (R)
 . Bill Shuster (R)
 . Tom Marino (R)
 . Lou Barletta (R)
 . Keith Rothfus (R)
 . Brendan Boyle (D)
 . Michael Doyle (D)
 . Charles Dent (R)
 . Joe Pitts (R)
 . Matt Cartwright (D)
 . Tim Murphy (R)

Rhode Island
 . David Cicilline (D)
 . James Langevin (D)

South Carolina
 . Mark Sanford (R)
 . Joe Wilson (R)
 . Jeff Duncan (R)
 . Trey Gowdy (R)
 . Mick Mulvaney (R)
 . Jim Clyburn (D)
 . Tom Rice (R)

South Dakota
 . Kristi Noem (R)

Tennessee
 . Phil Roe (R)
 . Jimmy Duncan (R)
 . Chuck Fleischmann (R)
 . Scott DesJarlais (R)
 . Jim Cooper (D)
 . Diane Black (R)
 . Marsha Blackburn (R)
 . Stephen Fincher (R)
 . Steve Cohen (D)

Texas
 . Louie Gohmert (R)
 . Ted Poe (R)
 . Sam Johnson (R)
 . John Ratcliffe (R)
 . Jeb Hensarling (R)
 . Joe Barton (R)
 . John Culberson (R)
 . Kevin Brady (R)
 . Al Green (D)
 . Michael McCaul (R)
 . Mike Conaway (R)
 . Kay Granger (R)
 . Mac Thornberry (R)
 . Randy Weber (R)
 . Ruben Hinojosa (D)
 . Beto O'Rourke (D)
 . Bill Flores (R)
 . Sheila Jackson Lee (D)
 . Randy Neugebauer (R)
 . Joaquin Castro (D)
 . Lamar Smith (R)
 . Pete Olson (R)
 . Will Hurd (R)
 . Kenny Marchant (R)
 . Roger Williams (R)
 . Michael Burgess (R)
 . Blake Farenthold (R)
 . Henry Cuellar (D)
 . Gene Green (D)
 . Eddie Bernice Johnson (D)
 . John Carter (R)
 . Pete Sessions (R)
 . Marc Veasey (D)
 . Filemon Vela Jr. (D)
 . Lloyd Doggett (D)
 . Brian Babin (R)

Utah
 . Rob Bishop (R)
 . Chris Stewart (R)
 . Jason Chaffetz (R)
 . Mia Love (R)

Vermont
 . Peter Welch (D)

Virginia
 . Rob Wittman (R)
 . Scott Rigell (R)
 . Bobby Scott (D)
 . Randy Forbes (R)
 . Robert Hurt (R)
 . Bob Goodlatte (R)
 . Dave Brat (R)
 . Don Beyer (D)
 . Morgan Griffith (R)
 . Barbara Comstock (R)
 . Gerry Connolly (D)

Washington
 . Suzan DelBene (D)
 . Rick Larsen (D)
 . Jaime Herrera Beutler (R)
 . Dan Newhouse (R)
 . Cathy McMorris Rodgers (R)
 . Derek Kilmer (D)
 . Jim McDermott (D)
 . Dave Reichert (R)
 . Adam Smith (D)
 . Dennis Heck (D)

West Virginia
 . David McKinley (R)
 . Alex Mooney (R)
 . Evan Jenkins (R)

Wisconsin
 . Paul Ryan (R)
 . Mark Pocan (D)
 . Ron Kind (D)
 . Gwen Moore (D)
 . Jim Sensenbrenner (R)
 . Glenn Grothman (R)
 . Sean Duffy (R)
 . Reid Ribble (R)

Wyoming
 . Cynthia Lummis (R)

Non-voting members
 . Amata Coleman Radewagen (R)
 . Eleanor Holmes Norton (D)
 . Madeleine Bordallo (D)
 . Gregorio Sablan (I)
 . Pedro Pierluisi (Resident Commissioner) (D/PNP)
 . Stacey Plaskett (D)

Changes in membership

Senate

There were no changes in Senate membership during this Congress.

House of Representatives

|-
| 
| nowrap  | Michael Grimm(R)
| Incumbent resigned January 5, 2015, following a guilty plea on one count of felony tax evasion.A special election was held May 5, 2015.
|  | Dan Donovan(R)
| May 12, 2015

|-
| 
| nowrap  | Alan Nunnelee(R)
| Incumbent died February 6, 2015.A special election runoff was held June 2, 2015.
|  | Trent Kelly(R)
| June 9, 2015

|-
| 
| nowrap  | Aaron Schock(R)
| Incumbent resigned March 31, 2015, following a spending scandal.A special election was held September 10, 2015.
|  | Darin LaHood(R)
| September 17, 2015

|-
| 
| nowrap  | John Boehner(R)
| Incumbent resigned October 31, 2015.A special election was held June 7, 2016.
|  | Warren Davidson(R)
| June 9, 2016

|-
| 
| nowrap  | Chaka Fattah(D)
| Incumbent resigned June 23, 2016, following a conviction of corruption charges.A special election was held November 8, 2016.
|  | Dwight Evans(D)
| November 14, 2016

|-
| 
| nowrap  | Mark Takai(D)
| Incumbent died July 20, 2016.A special election was held November 8, 2016.
|  | Colleen Hanabusa(D)
| November 14, 2016

|-
| 
| nowrap  | Ed Whitfield(R)
| Incumbent resigned September 6, 2016, following an ethics investigation.A special election was held November 8, 2016.
|  | James Comer(R)
| November 14, 2016

|-
| 
| nowrap  | Janice Hahn(D)
| Incumbent resigned December 4, 2016, to become a member of the Los Angeles County Board of Supervisors.No special election was held and the seat remained vacant until the next Congress. Hahn did not run for re-election in 2016.
| colspan=2 rowspan=2 | Vacant until the next Congress

|-
| 
| nowrap  | Candice Miller(R)
| Incumbent resigned December 31, 2016, to become Macomb County Public Works Commissioner.No special election was held and the seat remained vacant until the next Congress. Miller did not run for re-election in 2016.

|}

Committees
[Section contents: Senate, House, Joint ]

Senate

House of Representatives

Joint committees

Caucuses

Employees

Senate
Source: 
 Chaplain: Barry C. Black (Seventh-day Adventist)
 Curator: Melinda Smith 
 Librarian: Leona I. Faust
 Historian: Donald A. Ritchie, until June 1, 2015 
 Betty Koed, starting June 1, 2015
 Parliamentarian: Elizabeth MacDonough
 Secretary: Julie E. Adams
 Sergeant at Arms: Frank J. Larkin
 Secretary for the Majority: Laura Dove
 Secretary for the Minority: Gary B. Myrick

House of Representatives 
Source: 
 Chaplain: Patrick J. Conroy (Roman Catholic)
 Chief Administrative Officer: Ed Cassidy, until December 31, 2015
 Will Plaster, January 1, 2016 – August 1, 2016 
 Phil Kiko, from August 1, 2016
 Clerk: Karen L. Haas
 Historian: Matthew Wasniewski
 Inspector General: Theresa M. Grafenstine
 Parliamentarian: Thomas J. Wickham Jr.
 Reading Clerks: Susan Cole and Joseph Novotny
 Sergeant at Arms: Paul D. Irving

Legislative branch agency directors
 Architect of the Capitol: Stephen T. Ayers
 Attending Physician of the United States Congress: Brian P. Monahan
 Comptroller General of the United States: Eugene Louis Dodaro
 Director of the Congressional Budget Office: Douglas Elmendorf, until March 31, 2015
 Keith Hall, from April 1, 2015
 Librarian of Congress: James H. Billington, until September 30, 2015
 David S. Mao (acting), October 1, 2015 – September 14, 2016
 Carla Diane Hayden, from September 14, 2016
 Public Printer of the United States: Davita Vance-Cooks

See also

Elections 
 2014 United States elections (elections leading to this Congress)
 2014 United States Senate elections
 2014 United States House of Representatives elections
 2016 United States elections (elections during this Congress, leading to the next Congress)
 2016 United States presidential election
 2016 United States Senate elections
 2016 United States House of Representatives elections

Membership lists 
 List of new members of the 114th United States Congress

Notes

References

External links
 United States House of Representatives official website
 United States Senate official website
 Bills and Resolutions:
 House Amendments
 House Bills
 House Concurrent Resolutions
 House Joint Resolutions
 House Resolutions
 Senate Concurrent Resolutions
 Senate Resolutions
 Roll Call Votes:
 House
 Senate